Clapperton's spurfowl (Pternistis clappertoni) is a species of bird in the family Phasianidae.
It is found in Cameroon, Central African Republic, Chad, Eritrea, Ethiopia, Mali, Mauritania, Niger, Nigeria, Sudan, and Uganda.

Taxonomy
Clapperton's spurfowl was described in 1826 by John George Children and Nicholas Aylward Vigors in an appendix to the Narrative of Travels and Discoveries in Northern and Central Africa by the explorers Dixon Denham and Hugh Clapperton. Children and Vigors chose to honour Clapperton and coined the binomial name Francolinus clappertoni.  In their publication Children and Vigors did not specify where the specimen had been collected but the type locality was later designated as Borno in northeast Nigeria. The species is now placed in the genus Pternistis that was introduced by the German naturalist Johann Georg Wagler in 1832. A molecular phylogenetic study published in 2019 found that Clapperton's spurfowl is sister to Harwood's spurfowl.

Two subspecies are now recognised:
 P. c. clappertoni (Children & Vigors, 1826) — Mali to south Sudan, east South Sudan, northeast Uganda and west Ethiopia
 P. c. sharpii (Ogilvie-Grant, 1892) — north and central Ethiopia, Eritrea

Notes

References

External links

Xeno-canto: audio recordings of Clapperton's spurfowl

Clapperton's spurfowl
Birds of Sub-Saharan Africa
Clapperton's spurfowl
Clapperton's spurfowl
Taxonomy articles created by Polbot